The Morning After was Maureen McGovern's first studio album, released in July 1973 (see 1973 in music).

The album was released by popular demand following an Academy Award win for Best Song for "The Morning After", written by Al Kasha and Joel Hirschhorn. After the song's subsequent rise up the Billboard Top 100 charts, the eponymous album was released, eventually peaking in September at #77 on the Billboard Hot 200 list of popular albums.

"The Morning After" is the first track on the record. McGovern composed the music for the fourth and sixth tracks. Cover versions include Paul Williams' "I Won't Last a Day Without You" (which was an adult-contemporary hit for McGovern before becoming a national hit for The Carpenters) and Buffy Sainte-Marie's "Until It's Time for You to Go".

McGovern dedicated the album to her parents, Mary and James McGovern.

Track listing

Personnel and production
Arranged by Joe Hudson (tracks 1, 4, 5 & 7), Michel Rubini (tracks 2 & 8), Gene Page (tracks 3, 6 & 10), Gary Kekel (in tandem with Joe Hudson on track 4) & Bob Hill (track 9)
Conducted by Joe Hudson (tracks 1, 4, 5 & 7) & Bob Hill (tracks 2, 3, 6, 8, 9 & 10)
Produced by Carl Maduri for Belkin-Maduri Productions
Engineered and mixed by Arnie Rosenberg
Bob Fraser - guitar
Bill Severance - drums, percussion
Recorded at: Agency Recording Studios 1730 E. 24th Cleveland, OH 44114

Charts

1973 debut albums
Maureen McGovern albums
Albums arranged by Gene Page
20th Century Fox Records albums